Harpaz (הַרפָּז) is a Jewish surname derived from a Hebraization of German-Jewish Goldberg (literally "gold mountain"). Notable people with the surname include:

 Jacob Harpaz, CEO of ISCAR Metalworking
 Omri Harpaz, a member of the band Shulman (band)
 Neta Harpaz (1893-1970), a Zionist activist and Israeli politician (born Neta Goldberg)

Jewish surnames
Hebrew-language surnames